The Biggest Bundle of Them All is a 1968 American crime film set in Naples, Italy. The story is about a mobster and a novice gang of crooks who team up to steal $5 million worth of platinum ingots from a train. The film stars Robert Wagner and Raquel Welch and was directed by Ken Annakin.

Plot
An Italian gangster, Cesare Celli, formerly active in Chicago but now retired in his homeland of Italy, is kidnapped by Harry Price and his gang. Much to everyone's disappointment, none of Cesare's friends or associates is willing to pay a ransom to get him back.

His professional pride offended by this development, Cesare offers to assist Harry and girlfriend Juliana in pulling off a daring heist that could net them $5 million. Cesare even brings in criminal mastermind Professor Samuels to run the operation.

A Boeing B-17 Flying Fortress bomber is hijacked to be used to transport platinum ingots after a train robbery. Harry and the gang overcome many obstacles and the robbery is a great success, at least until the bomber doors open unexpectedly and the loot falls out.

Cast
 Robert Wagner as Harry
 Raquel Welch as Juliana
 Godfrey Cambridge as Benny
 Davy Kaye as Davey
 Francesco Mulé as Antonio Tozzi
 Vittorio De Sica as Cesare Celli
 Edward G. Robinson as Professor Samuels
 Victor Spinetti as Captain Giglio 
 Yvonne Sanson as Teresa 
 Mickey Knox as Joe Ware 
 Femi Benussi as Uncle Carlo's Wife 
 Paola Borboni as Miss Rosa 
 Aldo Bufi Landi as Captain Del Signore 
 Carlo Croccolo as Franco 
 Roberto De Simone as Uncle Carlo 
 Piero Gerlini as Captain Capuano 
 Giulio Marchetti as Lt. Naldi 
 Andrea Aureli as Carabiniere 
 Ermelinda De Felice as  Emma 
 Milena Vukotic as  Angelina Pedrone  
 Carlo Rizzo as Maitre d'Hotel
 Nino Vingelli as Restaurant Manager

Production
Director Ken Annakin recalled that ten days into pre-production of the film, then titled The Italian Caper, a story reader from MGM discovered an old script in their archives that had the same story as the film, and that script was currently being filmed as The Happening by producer Sam Spiegel for Columbia Pictures.  Producer Josef Shaftel met Spiegel with the result that he had to give up his 15% share of the profits, Spiegel had the power to approve every page of the shooting script, and the film, retitled The Biggest Bundle of Them All would not be released until six months after The Happening (which had a delayed release).

Filming began in April 1966. Female lead Raquel Welch had just made Fantastic Voyage and One Million Years BC, but the latter had not been released. She signed to make Fathom while shooting Biggest Bundle.

"I didn't get to know Raquel Welch too well - we didn't have too many scenes together," said Edward G. Robinson. "I must say she has quite a body. She has been the product of a good publicity campaign. I hope she lives up to it because a body will only take you so far."

Male lead Robert Wagner was under contract to Universal who loaned him out to make the film.

The interior scenes were filmed at the Cinecittà studios in Rome. The movie was released in France as "La Bande à César". The B-17 airplane used was B-17G-85VE 44-8846 and actual World War II combat veteran aircraft. Currently being flown by the Amicale Jean-Baptiste Salis Museum.

Annakin later recalled that Welch "tended to wing her lines a little bit and would keep us waiting, and I wasn't going to stand for any of this, so we had a big showdown quite early in the picture. I just said to her: `Unless you know your lines and come on time when you're called, I'm going to make sure I use you for the absolute minimum of time. I shan't do any closeups. I shall just do medium and long shots of you.' And, of course, being the woman she was, she was very co-operative after that!"

Soundtrack
The opening song, "Most of All There's You", sung by Johnny Mathis was written by Riz Ortolani with lyrics by Norman Newell. The title song,"The Biggest Bundle of Them All" was sung by the Animals; it was co-written by Ritchie Cordell and Sal Trimachi.

See also
 List of American films of 1968
 Train robbery

References

External links
 
 
 
 

1960s crime comedy films
1968 films
American crime comedy films
American heist films
Films scored by Riz Ortolani
Films set in Italy
Films set in Naples
Films directed by Ken Annakin
Metro-Goldwyn-Mayer films
Rail transport films
1968 comedy films
Films shot at Cinecittà Studios
1960s English-language films
1960s American films